Havana Township is located in Mason County, Illinois, United States. As of the 2010 census, its population was 4,816 and it contained 2,295 housing units.

History
Havana Township was named after Havana, the capital of Cuba.

Geography

Demographics

References

External links
City-data.com
Illinois State Archives

Townships in Mason County, Illinois
Townships in Illinois